Ara Vaghinag Bekaryan (May 30, 1913 - June 18, 1986) was an Armenian painter, graphic, pedagogue, and USSR portrait artist. He was born in Afyonkarahisar, Turkey to a family of educators.

Biography 
 In 1932, Bekaryan graduated from Yerevan's Geghard College with Vahram Gayfejyan and Sedrak Arakelyan
 In 1939, Bekaryan graduated from the Russian Academy of Arts in Saint Petersburg
 From 1939 to 1945 he joined the Russo-Finnish wars and World War II
 From 1945 to 1986 he lectured at Yerevan State Academy of Fine Arts and the Yerevan State Institute of Theatre and Cinematography
 In 1964, a professor
 Exhibition in 1930
 Individual exhibitions in 1947 (Yerevan), 1964 (Yerevan), 1964 (Moscow)
 Armenian Soviet Socialist Republic distinguished artist in 1945
 Armenian Soviet Socialist Republic portrait artist in 1965

Work 
 Close to the Swing
 Florists
 Ashtarak
 Oshakan
 Rest
 Vahan Terian's portrait
 "Nazar the Brave" book design
 "Nairi's World" book design
 Hagop Baronian's work designs

In memory 
The Central Bank of Armenia has released a silver coin in tribute to Ara Bekaryan's 100th birthday. The face of the coin has a picture representing an episode of "Ashtarak" canvas, the reverse portrait depicts Ara Bekaryan and "Nazar the Brave" fairy tale illustration.

Literature 
 Маня Казарян "Ара Бекарян" Советский художник 1976 г. Москва (Rus.)
 Daniel Dznuni's "Armenian Visual Artists" - 1977, Yerevan
 Manya Ghazaryan's "Ara Bekaryan" - 1984, Yerevan

References

External links 
 Ara Bekaryan's biography

1913 births
1986 deaths
20th-century Armenian painters
People from Afyonkarahisar
Turkish painters
Turkish people of Armenian descent
Turkish emigrants to the Soviet Union
Soviet painters